The History of the Shroud of Turin begins in the year 1390 AD, when Bishop Pierre d'Arcis wrote a memorandum where he charged that the Shroud was a forgery. Historical records seem to indicate that a shroud bearing an image of a crucified man existed in the possession of Geoffroy de Charny in the small town of Lirey, France around the years 1353 to 1357.  The history from the 15th century to the present is well documented.

The period until 1390 is subject to debate and controversy among historians. Prior to the 14th century there are some allegedly congruent but controversial references such as the Pray Codex. Although there are numerous reports of Jesus' burial shroud, or an image of his head, of unknown origin, being venerated in various locations before the 14th century, there is no reliable historical evidence that these refer to the shroud currently at Turin Cathedral. A burial cloth, which some historians maintain was the Shroud, was owned by the Byzantine emperors but disappeared during the Sack of Constantinople in 1204. Barbara Frale has cited that the Order of Knights Templar were in the possession of a relic showing a red, monochromatic image of a bearded man on linen or cotton.

In 1453 Margaret de Charny deeded the Shroud to the House of Savoy. In 1532, the shroud suffered damage from a fire in the church in Chambery, France where it was stored. A drop of molten silver from the reliquary produced a symmetrically placed mark through the layers of the folded cloth. Poor Clare Nuns attempted to repair this damage with patches. Repairs were made to the shroud in 1694 by Sebastian Valfrè to improve the repairs of the Poor Clare nuns. Further repairs were made in 1868 by Clotilde of Savoy.

In 1578 the House of Savoy took the shroud to Turin and it has remained at Turin Cathedral ever since. As of the 17th century the shroud has been displayed (e.g. in the chapel built for that purpose by Guarino Guarini) and in 1898 it was first photographed during a public exhibition. The shroud remained the property of the House of Savoy until 1983, when it was given to the Holy See, the rule of the House of Savoy having ended in 1946.

A fire, possibly caused by arson, threatened the shroud on 11 April 1997. In 2002, the Holy See had the shroud restored. The cloth backing and thirty patches were removed, making it possible to photograph and scan the reverse side of the cloth, which had been hidden from view for centuries. The Shroud was exhibited to the public from August 8 to August 12, 2018.

Fringe speculations about early artworks and relics

Although there are numerous reports of Jesus' burial shroud, or an image of his head, of unknown origin, being venerated in various locations before the fourteenth century, there is no historical evidence that these refer to the shroud currently at Turin Cathedral. Various speculations have attempted to link the Shroud of Turin with the legendary Image of Edessa although no legend connected with that image suggests that it contained the image of a beaten and bloody Jesus. Others have denied the possibility of the Turin shroud being identified with the Image of Edessa, on various grounds.

Shroud proponents cite an illustration in the Codex Pray, an Illuminated manuscript written in Budapest, Hungary between 1192 and 1195, as evidence for the shroud's existence before the fourteenth century. However Italian Shroud researcher Gian Marco Rinaldi interprets the item that is sometimes identified as the Shroud as a probable rectangular tombstone as seen on other sacred images. Rinaldi also points out that the alleged shroud in the Pray Codex does not contain any image of a human body, and that a wadded cloth is clearly visible on top of this object.

14th and 15th centuries
The fullest academic account of the history of the Shroud since its first appearance in 1355 is John Beldon-Scott, Architecture for the Shroud: Relic and Ritual in Turin, University of Chicago Press, 2003. This study is indispensable for its many illustrations that show features of the Shroud images now lost.

The 14th century attribution of the origin of the shroud refers to a shroud in Lirey, France dating to 1353–1357. It is related that the widow of the French knight Geoffroi de Charny had it displayed in a church at Lirey, France (diocese of Troyes). According to the 1913 Catholic Encyclopedia:

On 20 June 1353, Geoffroy de Charny, Lord of Savoisy and Lirey, founded at Lirey in honour of the Annunciation a collegiate church with six canonries, and in this church he exposed for veneration the Holy Winding Sheet. Opposition arose on the part of the Bishop of Troyes, who declared after due inquiry that the relic was nothing but a painting, and opposed its exposition. Clement VI by four Bulls, 6 Jan., 1390, approved the exposition as lawful. In 1418 during the civil wars, the canons entrusted the Winding Sheet to Humbert, Count de La Roche, Lord of Lirey. Margaret, widow of Humbert, never returned it but gave it in 1452 to the Duke of Savoy. The requests of the canons of Lirey were unavailing, and the Lirey Winding Sheet is the same that is now exposed and honoured at Turin."

In the Museum Cluny in Paris, the coats of arms of this knight and his widow can be seen on a pilgrim medallion, which also shows an image of the Shroud of Turin.

During the fourteenth century, the shroud was often publicly exposed, though not continuously, because the bishop of Troyes, Henri de Poitiers, had prohibited veneration of the image. Thirty-two years after this pronouncement, the image was displayed again, and King Charles VI of France ordered its removal to Troyes, citing the impropriety of the image. The sheriffs were unable to carry out the order.

In 1389, the image was denounced as a fraud by Bishop Pierre D'Arcis in a letter to the Avignon Antipope Clement VII, mentioning that the image had previously been denounced by his predecessor Henri de Poitiers, who had been concerned that no such image was mentioned in scripture. Bishop D'Arcis continued, "Eventually, after diligent inquiry and examination, he discovered how the said cloth had been cunningly painted, the truth being attested by the artist who had painted it, to wit, that it was a work of human skill and not miraculously wrought or bestowed." (In German:.) The artist is not named in the letter.

The letter of Bishop D'Arcis also mentions Bishop Henri's attempt to suppress veneration but notes that the cloth was quickly hidden "for 35 years or so", thus agreeing with the historical details already established above. The letter provides an accurate description of the cloth: "upon which by a clever sleight of hand was depicted the twofold image of one man, that is to say, the back and the front, he falsely declaring and pretending that this was the actual shroud in which our Saviour Jesus Christ was enfolded in the tomb, and upon which the whole likeness of the Saviour had remained thus impressed together with the wounds which He bore."

Despite the pronouncement of Bishop D'Arcis, Antipope Clement VII (first antipope of the Western Schism) did not revoke the permission given earlier to the church of Lirey to display the object, but instructed its clergy that it should not be treated as a relic and should not be presented to the public as the actual shroud of Christ, but as an image or representation of it. He prescribed indulgences for the many pilgrims who came to the church out of devotion for "even a representation of this kind", so that veneration continued.

In 1418, Humbert of Villersexel, Count de la Roche, Lord of Saint-Hippolyte-sur-Doubs, moved the shroud to his castle at Montfort, Doubs, to provide protection against criminal bands, after he married Charny's granddaughter Margaret. It was later moved to Saint-Hippolyte-sur-Doubs. After Humbert's death, canons of Lirey fought through the courts to force the widow to return the cloth, but the parliament of Dole and the Court of Besançon left it to the widow, who traveled with the shroud to various expositions, notably in Liège and Geneva.

The widow sold the shroud in exchange for a castle in Varambon, France in 1453. The new owner, Anne of Cyprus, Duchess of Savoy, stored it in the Savoyard capital of Chambéry in the newly built Saint-Chapelle, which Pope Paul II shortly thereafter raised to the dignity of a collegiate church. In 1464, Anne's husband, Louis, Duke of Savoy agreed to pay an annual fee to the Lirey canons in exchange for their dropping claims of ownership of the cloth. Beginning in 1471, the shroud was moved between many cities of Europe, being housed briefly in Vercelli, Turin, Ivrea, Susa, Chambéry, Avigliana, Rivoli, and Pinerolo. A description of the cloth by two sacristans of the Sainte-Chapelle from around this time noted that it was stored in a reliquary: "enveloped in a red silk drape, and kept in a case covered with crimson velours, decorated with silver-gilt nails, and locked with a golden key."

In 1543 John Calvin, in his Treatise on Relics, wrote of the Shroud, which was then at Nice, "How is it possible that those sacred historians, who carefully related all the miracles that took place at Christ’s death, should have omitted to mention one so remarkable as the likeness of the body of our Lord remaining on its wrapping sheet?" He also noted that, according to St. John, there was one sheet covering Jesus's body, and a separate cloth covering his head. He then stated that "either St. John is a liar," or else anyone who promotes such a shroud is "convicted of falsehood and deceit".

16th century to present

The history of the shroud from the middle of the 16th century is well recorded. The existence of a miniature by Giulio Clovio, which gives a good representation of what was seen upon the shroud about the year 1540, confirms that the shroud housed in Turin today is the same one as in the middle of the 16th century. In 1578 the House of Savoy took the shroud to Turin and it has remained at Turin Cathedral ever since.

In 1532, the shroud suffered damage from a fire in the chapel where it was stored. A drop of molten silver from the reliquary produced a symmetrically placed mark through the layers of the folded cloth. Poor Clare Nuns attempted to repair this damage with patches. Some have suggested that there was also water damage from the extinguishing of the fire. However, there is some evidence that the watermarks were made by condensation in the bottom of a burial jar in which the folded shroud may have been kept at some point. In 1578, the shroud arrived again at its current location in Turin. It was the property of the House of Savoy until 1983, when it was given to the Holy See, the rule of the House of Savoy having ended in 1946.

In 1988, the Holy See agreed to a radiocarbon dating of the relic, for which a small piece from a corner of the shroud was removed, divided, and sent to laboratories. The radiocarbon dating tests established that the shroud was from the Middle Ages, between the years 1260 and 1390. Another fire, possibly caused by arson, threatened the shroud on 11 April 1997, but fireman Mario Trematore was able to remove it from its heavily protected display case and prevent further damage. In 2002, the Holy See had the shroud restored. The cloth backing and thirty patches were removed. This made it possible to photograph and scan the reverse side of the cloth, which had been hidden from view. Using sophisticated mathematical and optical techniques, a ghostly part-image of the body was found on the back of the shroud in 2004. Italian scientists had exposed the faint imprint of the face and hands of the figure.
The Shroud was publicly exhibited in 2000 for the Great Jubilee, and in 2010 with the approval of Pope Benedict XVI, and in 2015 with the approval of Pope Francis. Another exhibition is scheduled for 2025.

Detailed comments on this operation were published by various Shroud researchers. In 2003, the principal restorer Mechthild Flury-Lemberg, a textile expert from Switzerland, published a book with the title Sindone 2002: L'intervento conservativo – Preservation – Konservierung. She describes the operation and the reasons it was believed necessary. In 2005, William Meacham, an archaeologist who has studied the Shroud since 1981, published the book The Rape of the Turin Shroud which is fiercely critical of the operation. He rejects the reasons provided by Flury-Lemberg and describes in detail what he calls "a disaster for the scientific study of the relic".

Historical attributions

Christian iconography

Art historian W.S.A. Dale proposed that the Shroud was an icon created for liturgical use, and suggested an 11th-century date based on art-historical grounds.

Analysis of proportion
The man on the image is taller than the average first-century resident of Judaea and the right hand has longer fingers than the left, along with a significant increase of length in the right forearm compared to the left.

Analysis of optical perspective
Further evidence for the Shroud as an art object comes from what might be called the "Mercator projection" argument. The shroud in two dimensions presents a three-dimensional image projected onto a planar (two-dimensional) surface, just as in a photograph or painting. This perspective is consistent with both painting and with image formation using a bas relief.

Variegated images
Banding on the Shroud is background noise, which causes us to see the gaunt face, long nose, deep eyes, and straight hair. These features are caused by dark vertical and horizontal bands that go across the eyes. Using enhancement software (fast Fourier transform filters), the effect of these bands can be minimized. The result is a more detailed image of the shroud.

Burial posture 
The burial posture of the shroud, with hands crossed over the pelvis, was used by Essenes (2nd century BC to the 1st century AD), but was also found in a burial site under a medieval church with skeletons which were dated pre-1390 and post Roman.

Leonardo da Vinci
In June 2009, the British television station Channel 5 aired a documentary that claimed the shroud was forged by Leonardo da Vinci.

Recently a study stated that the shroud of Turin had been faked by Leonardo da Vinci. According to the study, the Renaissance artist created the artifact by using pioneering photographic techniques and a sculpture of his own head, and suggests that the image on the relic is Leonardo's face which could have been projected onto the cloth, The Daily Telegraph reported.

History Today article
In an article published by History Today in November 2014, British scholar Charles Freeman analyses early depictions and descriptions of the Shroud and argues that the iconography of the bloodstains and all-over scourge marks are not known before 1300 and the Shroud was a painted linen at that date, with the paint having disintegrated leaving a discoloured linen image underneath. He also argues that the dimensions and format of the weave are typical of a medieval treadle loom. As it was unlikely that a forger would have deceived anyone with a single cloth with images on it, Freeman seeks an alternative function. He goes on to argue that the Shroud was a medieval prop used in Easter ritual plays depicting the resurrection of Christ. He believes it was used in a ceremony called the 'Quem Quaeritis?' or 'whom do you seek?' which involved re-enacting gospel accounts of the resurrection, and is represented as such in the well-known Lirey pilgrim badge. As such it was deservedly an object of veneration from the fourteenth century as it is still is today.

See also
 Conservation-restoration of the Shroud of Turin
 Fringe theories about the Shroud of Turin
 Radiocarbon dating of the Shroud of Turin

References

Shroud of Turin
Tourist attractions in Turin